Marcelo Tinari (born 8 February 1993) is an Argentine professional footballer who plays as a centre back for Acassuso.

Career
Tinari played for the Banfield and Los Andes academies. In August 2013, Tinari joined Acassuso of Primera B Metropolitana. He remained for eleven months but didn't make a competitive appearance, though was an unused substitute for a Copa Argentina tie on 5 March 2014 with Deportivo Español. In the following July, Tinari joined Almirante Brown. He made his senior bow in the third tier during a draw away to Deportivo Merlo on 21 September, which was the first of four matches he participated in during the 2014 Primera B Metropolitana. Deportivo Español became Tinari's third senior club in January 2015. No appearances followed.

A return to Primera B Nacional's Los Andes was completed on 1 January 2016. He played against All Boys and Central Córdoba in 2016 as they placed ninth. Tinari stayed for the 2016–17 campaign without featuring, prior to signing for Villa Dálmine in August 2017. Felipe De la Riva selected the defender four times either side of the mid-season break, though he wouldn't feature again in 2017–18 after suffering a tibia fracture injury in an encounter with Guillermo Brown on 4 March 2018; which caused the match to be paused for eighteen minutes.

Career statistics
.

References

External links

1993 births
Living people
People from Banfield, Buenos Aires
Argentine footballers
Association football defenders
Primera B Metropolitana players
Primera Nacional players
Club Atlético Acassuso footballers
Club Almirante Brown footballers
Deportivo Español footballers
Club Atlético Los Andes footballers
Villa Dálmine footballers
Sportspeople from Buenos Aires Province